The 2003 IIHF World U20 Championship, commonly referred as the 2003 World Junior Hockey Championships (2003 WJHC), was the 27th edition of the Ice Hockey World Junior Championship. The tournament was held in Halifax and Sydney, Nova Scotia, Canada, from December 26, 2002 to January 5, 2003. Russia won the gold medal for the second consecutive year with a 3–2 victory over Canada in the championship game, while Finland won the bronze medal with a 3–2 victory over the United States.

Playoff round (again) reverted to six teams qualifying, with group leaders getting a bye into the semifinals.

Venues

Rosters

Top Division

Preliminary round

Group A

All times local (AST/UTC-4).

Group B

All times local (AST/UTC-4).

Relegation round
Results from games played during the preliminary round were carried forward to the relegation round.

All times local (AST/UTC-4).

Playoff round
Source:

Quarterfinals

Semifinals

5th place game

Bronze medal game

Final

Scoring leaders

Goaltending leaders
Minimum 40% of team's ice time.

Tournament awards

Final standings

Division I
The Division I championships were played on December 27, 2002 – January 2, 2003 in Almaty, Kazakhstan (Group A), and on December 16–22, 2002 in Bled, Slovenia (Group B).

Group A

Group B

Division II
The Division II championships were played on January 6–12, 2003 in Miercurea-Ciuc, Romania (Group A), and on December 28, 2002 – January 3, 2003 in Novi Sad, Federal Republic of Yugoslavia (Group B).

Group A

Group B

Division III
The Division III championship was played on January 21–26, 2003 in İzmit, Turkey.

References

 
World Junior Ice Hockey Championships
World Junior Ice Hockey Championships
Ice hockey competitions in Halifax, Nova Scotia
International ice hockey competitions hosted by Canada
World
World Junior Ice Hockey Championships
December 2002 sports events in Canada
January 2003 sports events in Canada
21st century in Halifax, Nova Scotia
Sport in Bled
Sports competitions in Almaty
2002–03 in Kazakhstani ice hockey
International ice hockey competitions hosted by Slovenia
International ice hockey competitions hosted by Kazakhstan
Miercurea Ciuc
2002–03 in Romanian ice hockey
International ice hockey competitions hosted by Romania
Sports competitions in Novi Sad
21st century in Novi Sad
2002–03 in Yugoslav ice hockey
International ice hockey competitions hosted by Yugoslavia